Divine Justice may refer to:

 Divine law
 Divine judgment
 Attributes of God
 A theological concept such as the philosophical divine command theory
 Divine Justice (novel), a novel by David Baldacci
 Advent of Divine Justice, a Bahá'í text.

See also

 Divine command theory
 Last Judgment